The Ambassador Extraordinary and Plenipotentiary of the Russian Federation to the United States of America is the official representative of the President of the Russian Federation and the Government of the Russian Federation to the President of the United States and the Government of the United States of America.

The ambassador and his staff work at large in the Embassy of Russia in Washington, D.C. The ambassador to the United States is concurrently appointed as the Russian representative to the Organization of American States. The ambassador's residence is located at 1125 16th Street Northwest. There are Consulates General in New York and in Houston. The post of Russian Ambassador to the United States is currently held by Anatoly Antonov, incumbent since 21 August 2017.

List of Ambassadors

Ambassadors of the Russian Empire to the United States of America

Ambassadors of the Russian Provisional Government to the United States of America

Ambassadors of the Soviet Russia/Soviet Union to the United States of America

Ambassadors of the Russian Federation to the United States of America

References

External links

 
 
United States
Russia
Ambassadors